The women's team competition at the 2017 European Judo Championships in Warsaw was held on 23 April at the Torwar Hall.

Each team consisted of five judokas from the –52, 57, 63, 70 and +70 kg categories.

Teams

Results

Repechage

References

External links
 

Wteam
EU 2017
European Women's Team Judo Championships
European Wteam